Nathaniel "Sonny Boy" Jeffries (August 5, 1914 – April 17, 1995) was an American Negro league pitcher in the 1940s.

A native of Rochester, New York, Jeffries made his Negro leagues debut in 1940 for the Homestead Grays, and went on to play for the New York Black Yankees in 1948. He died in Rochester in 1995 at age 80.

References

External links
 and Seamheads

1914 births
1995 deaths
Homestead Grays players
New York Black Yankees players
Baseball pitchers
Baseball players from New York (state)
Sportspeople from Rochester, New York